The komba gewerkschaft is a German trade union in Berlin. It organises over 80.000 local administration workers.

External links
komba gewerkschaft

Trade unions in Germany
Organisations based in Berlin